The men's 200 metre backstroke event at the 1984 Summer Olympics was held in the Uytengsu Aquatics Center in Los Angeles on July 31, 1984. There were 34 competitors from 25 nations, with each nation limited to two swimmers (down from three in previous Games). The event was won by Rick Carey of the United States, the nation's third victory in the men's 200 metre backstroke. Frédéric Delcourt of France took silver and Cameron Henning of Canada earned bronze; it was the first medal in the event for each of those two nations.

Carey won by 1.52 seconds at 2:00.23, an easy victory but a disappointing time for Carey. He did not celebrate and did not smile or acknowledge the crowd during the medal ceremony. His demeanor was heavily criticized, resulting in his issuing an apology.

Background

This was the seventh appearance of the 200 metre backstroke event. It was first held in 1900. The event did not return until 1964; since then, it has been on the programme at every Summer Games. From 1904 to 1960, a men's 100 metre backstroke was held instead. In 1964, only the 200 metres was held. Beginning in 1968 and ever since, both the 100 and 200 metre versions have been held.

One of the 8 finalists from the 1980 returned: sixth-place finisher Michael Söderlund of Sweden. The medalists at the 1982 World Aquatics Championships had been Rick Carey of the United States, Sándor Wladár of Hungary (who was also the 1980 Olympic champion), and Frank Baltrusch of East Germany; with Hungary and East Germany joining the Soviet-led boycott of the Games, only Carey competed in Los Angeles—and was heavily favoured. Carey was also the world record holder, having broken John Naber's record in 1983 and then improved on his own time at the 1984 U.S. Olympic trials.

The Bahamas, the People's Republic of China, Egypt, Greece, Honduras, Indonesia, Jamaica, New Zealand, and Venezuela each made their debut in the event. Australia, Great Britain, and Sweden each made their sixth appearance, matching the Netherlands (absent for the first time) for most among nations to that point.

Competition format

The competition used a two-round (heats and final) format. The advancement rule followed the format introduced in 1952. A swimmer's place in the heat was not used to determine advancement; instead, the fastest times from across all heats in a round were used. A "consolation final" was added in 1984. There were 5 heats of up to 8 swimmers each. The top 8 swimmers advanced to the final. The next 8 (9th through 16th) competed in a consolation final. Swim-offs were used as necessary to break ties.

This swimming event used backstroke. Because an Olympic-size swimming pool is 50 metres long, this race consisted of four lengths of the pool.

Records

Prior to this competition, the existing world and Olympic records were as follows.

The following records were established during the competition:

Schedule

All times are Pacific Daylight Time (UTC-7)

Results

Heats
Rule: The eight fastest swimmers advance to final A, while the next eight to final B.

Finals

Final B

Final A

References

External links
 Official Report
 USA Swimming

B
200 metre backstroke at the Olympics
Men's events at the 1984 Summer Olympics